Serai Lashkari Khan located near Gurdwara Manji Sahib, Kotan (near Doraha) in Ludhiana District, Punjab, India is a historical inn built by Mughal military general Lashkari Khan, in the reign of Emperor Aurangzeb in 1667 CE.

History
A specimen of major structural types of Islamic architecture, this is one of many Carvanserais meant to be halting places along the old Mughal highway connecting Agra, Delhi and Lahore. These caravanserais played an important role in economic, cultural and political life but gradually fell in disuse with shifting routes and advent of railroads in the nineteenth century. Many of these disappeared altogether due to modernization and urban expansion.

The historic inn, though, declared as a protected monument has largely been neglected and has been in a dilapidated condition.

In popular media
This Serai was made popular after it was featured in the popular movie Rang De Basanti referred to by its acronym RDB. Some tourists started referring to it the RDB fort after that.

See also
Mughal Serai, Doraha
Tourism in Punjab, India

References

Ludhiana district
Tourism in Punjab, India
Mughal caravanserais
Monuments and memorials in Punjab, India
Ruins in India
Caravanserais in India